Center Township is a township in Dade County, in the U.S. state of Missouri.

Center Township is located near the Dade County's geographical center, hence the name.

References

Townships in Missouri
Townships in Dade County, Missouri
Populated places disestablished in 2017